Lophoruza is a genus of moths of the family Noctuidae. The genus was erected by George Hampson in 1910.

Species
 Lophoruza albicostalis (Leech, 1889)
 Lophoruza albisecta (Warren, 1912)
 Lophoruza apiciplaga (Warren, 1913)
 Lophoruza bella (Bethune-Baker, 1906)
 Lophoruza chalcocosma Turner, 1945
 Lophoruza cithara (Swinhoe, 1902)
 Lophoruza consors (Warren, 1913)
 Lophoruza diagonalis Hampson, 1910
 Lophoruza diversalis (Walker, [1868])
 Lophoruza jugosa (Swinhoe, 1902)
 Lophoruza longipalpis (Walker, 1865)
 Lophoruza lunifera (Moore, [1885])
 Lophoruza mascarena de Joannis, 1910
 Lophoruza mobdosticha Turner, 1945
 Lophoruza pulcherrima (Butler, 1879)
 Lophoruza purpureogrisea (Warren, 1913)
 Lophoruza roseoliva (Warren, 1913)
 Lophoruza rubrimacula Prout, 1921
 Lophoruza semicervina (Warren, 1913)
 Lophoruza semiscripta (Mabille, 1893)
 Lophoruza tamsi Roepke, 1938
 Lophoruza vacillatrix Hampson, 1910
 Lophoruza xylonota (Lower, 1903)

References

 

Acontiinae